World Trigger is a Japanese anime series based on the manga series of the same name written and illustrated by Daisuke Ashihara. The series was produced by Toei Animation and broadcast on TV Asahi from October 5, 2014 to April 3, 2016. The series is directed by Mitsuru Hongo with series composition by Hiroyuki Yoshino. Toshihisa Kaiya and Hitomi Tsuruta are the character designers and animation directors, and the music is composed by Kenji Kawai. The series was slated to run for 50 episodes, but ended up having 73 episodes.

In summer 2015, the World Trigger Summer Festival 2015 event announced World Trigger: Isekai Kara no Tōbōsha, a brand new series with an original story not presented in the World Trigger manga, and with new characters and concepts. This "new series" actually ended up being the "Fugitive Arc" of the anime, which ran from Episodes 49 to 63. On March 7, 2016, it was confirmed that the World Trigger anime would end, after it was announced that TV Asahi would be replacing the time slot airing it with sports programming.

In North America, Toei announced in July 2015 that they would be producing an English dub with Ocean Productions. The series began airing in the United States on Primo TV on January 16, 2017. The English dub became available on Crunchyroll on February 11, 2020.


Episode list

References

World Trigger
2014 Japanese television seasons
2015 Japanese television seasons
2016 Japanese television seasons